Per is a 1975 Danish drama film directed by Hans Kristensen. The film was selected as the Danish entry for the Best Foreign Language Film at the 48th Academy Awards, but was not accepted as a nominee. Agneta Ekmanner received the Bodil Award for Best Actress in a Leading Role for her performance in the film.

Cast
 Ole Ernst as Per Hansen
 Frits Helmuth as Helge Lorentzen
 Agneta Ekmanner as Marianne Lorentzen
 Peter Ronild as Tysk sprængstofekspert
 Per Årman as Betjent
 Else Petersen as Fru Petersen
 Alf Lassen as Vagtmand
 Søren Steen as Vagtmand
 Poul Møller as Ekspedient I pornoforretning
 Holger Munk as Politiinspektør
 Pernille Grumme as Prostitueret
 Ingerlise Gaarde as Ekspedient
 Hans Kristensen as Bilist

See also
 List of submissions to the 48th Academy Awards for Best Foreign Language Film
 List of Danish submissions for the Academy Award for Best Foreign Language Film

References

External links
 

1975 films
Danish drama films
1970s Danish-language films
1975 drama films
Films directed by Hans Kristensen